Like This may refer to:

Like This (album), a 1984 album by The dB's

Songs
"Like This" (Kelly Rowland song), 2007
"Like This" (Mims song), 2007
"Like This", by Brandy Norwood from Full Moon
"Like This", by Jessica Mauboy featuring Iyaz from Get 'Em Girls
"Like This", by Marques Houston from Veteran
"Like This", by Meisa Kuroki
"Like This", by Shawn Mendes from Illuminate
"Like This", by Snoop Dogg from Tha Blue Carpet Treatment
"Like This", by Technotronic featuring Monday Midnite
"Like This", by Wonder Girls
"Like This", by Pentagon from Demo 01
"Like This", by STAYC from Star to a Young Culture
"So Sexy Chapter II (Like This), by Twista, 2004